is a Japanese athlete. He competed in the men's 200 metres event at the 2019 World Athletics Championships.

References

External links

Eurosport profile

1996 births
Living people
Japanese male sprinters
Place of birth missing (living people)
World Athletics Championships athletes for Japan
World Athletics Championships medalists